Huang Qiushuang, born on 28 May 1992, is a Chinese gymnast. She is an individual all-arounder known for her clean form and artistry. She was a part of the Chinese team for the London 2012 Olympic Games.

Gymnastics career
Huang started gymnastics training at the age of 5. In junior competition during 2005 and 2006, Huang won championship titles at the Chinese national level in vault, uneven bars, balance beam, all-around, and with her team. Huang represented the province of Guangdong in national level competition. At the 2008 national championships, she obtained gold with the team. At the 2009 national championships, she obtained silver in the all-around, bronze on the floor, and bronze with the team.

At the international level, Huang represented China at the 2009 Japan Cup in July 2009. She won gold in the individual all-around ahead of Russian soon-to be stars Aliya Mustafina and Tatiana Nabieva, and gold in the team event with teammates He Kexin, Xiao Sha and Zhang Jing.

At the 11th Chinese national games in September 2009, Huang participated as part of the Guangdong team, despite a lower leg injury. She received a silver in the team event, where Guangdong was narrowly defeated by 0.125 points by the Shanghai team led by Sui Lu. In the individual events, Huang qualified first in the all-around, second on the floor and third on the uneven bars. However, she did not earn any medals on floor (6th) and in the all-around (5th) due to errors, or on the uneven bars, having forfeited her uneven bars finals position to Guangdong teammate Wu Liufang.

Huang did not attend the 2009 World Championships in London because of her injury.

She participated in the 2010 Doha World Cup, where she won gold on uneven bars and silver on floor.

At the 2010 World Championships, Huang won a bronze medal with the team and came fourth in the all-around. She qualified in second for the uneven bars final, but came sixth due to a fall.

At the 2010 Asian Games in Guangzhou, Huang won gold medals with the team and on vault, and silver medals in the all-around and on uneven bars.

At the 2011 World Championships, Huang won a bronze medal with the team and came fifth in the all-around. She also won her first individual World Championships medal on uneven bars by coming third in the event final.

At the 2012 Olympic Games, Huang was seventh on uneven bars in qualification, but did not qualify due to the two-per-country rule. She qualified in 10th place to the AA final. In the finals, she helped the Chinese team to a fourth-place finish. During the floor competition in the team final she fell on her 2.5 punch front scoring a 12.500 and placed seventh in the all-around final.  She retired shortly after the London Olympics.

Competitive history

References

1992 births
Living people
Chinese female artistic gymnasts
Medalists at the World Artistic Gymnastics Championships
Gymnasts at the 2012 Summer Olympics
Olympic gymnasts of China
Originators of elements in artistic gymnastics
Gymnasts from Hubei
People from Xiangyang
Asian Games medalists in gymnastics
Gymnasts at the 2010 Asian Games
Asian Games gold medalists for China
Asian Games silver medalists for China
Medalists at the 2010 Asian Games